Allendale Township is a township in Grand Forks County, North Dakota, United States. It has a population of 368 people with a population density of ten people per square mile.

References

Townships in Grand Forks County, North Dakota
Townships in North Dakota